Zlatko Škorić (27 July 1941 – 23 May 2019) was a Croatian football goalkeeper. He got eight caps for the Yugoslavia national team.

Club career
He played a total of 221 matches for Dinamo Zagreb and won the he won the Inter-Cities Fairs Cup in 1967 with them as well as four Yugoslav Cups: in 1960, 1963, 1965 and 1969.

International career
Škorić made his debut for Yugoslavia in an April 1964 friendly match against Bulgaria and earned a total of 8 caps, scoring no goals. His final international was a May 1966 friendly against Hungary.

Death
He died in May 2019.

References

External links
 
 U Zagrebu je preminuo legendarni golman Dinama Zlatko Škorić - Žoga 

1941 births
2019 deaths
Footballers from Zagreb
Association football goalkeepers
Yugoslav footballers
Yugoslavia international footballers
Olympic footballers of Yugoslavia
Footballers at the 1964 Summer Olympics
GNK Dinamo Zagreb players
AC Avignonnais players
NK Olimpija Ljubljana (1945–2005) players
VfB Stuttgart players
FC Bayern Munich footballers
NK Zagreb players
Yugoslav First League players
Ligue 2 players
Bundesliga players
Yugoslav expatriate footballers
Expatriate footballers in France
Yugoslav expatriate sportspeople in France
Expatriate footballers in West Germany
Yugoslav expatriate sportspeople in West Germany
Yugoslav football managers
NK Marsonia managers
Angola national football team managers
HNK Segesta managers
Yugoslav expatriate football managers
Expatriate football managers in Angola
Yugoslav expatriate sportspeople in Angola
GNK Dinamo Zagreb non-playing staff